Herculia or Herculius may refer to:

Ancient Roman military units 
 Cohors I Herculia Raetorum
 Legio II Herculia
 Legio VI Herculia

Other uses 
 Herculia (moth), a genus of snout moths
 Aegyptus Herculia, an Ancient Roman province of Egypt
 Gorsium-Herculia, now Tác, Hungary
 , a Roman road in Italia

See also 
 Hercules
 Herculea